Raddaus is a genus of crabs in the family Pseudothelphusidae, containing the following species:
 Raddaus bocourti (A. Milne-Edwards, 1866)
 Raddaus mertensi (Bott, 1956)
 Raddaus orestrius (Smalley, 1965)
 Raddaus tuberculatus (Rathbun, 1897)

References

Pseudothelphusidae